The High Commission of Canada in Singapore is a diplomatic mission of Canada to Singapore. It is located at One George Street, Singapore. The high commission provides consular services to Canadians and visa services to foreign citizens. The high commission also covers bilateral cooperation including trade and education.

References

See also 
 Canada–Singapore relations

Canada–Singapore relations
Singapore
Canada